Grafotechna (Grafotechna n. p., Závod 5, Výroba písma, mosazných linek a matric) was a Czechoslovak type foundry, created in 1951. It ceased to exist after 1990. It was the only manufacturer of metal types in the former Czechoslovakia.

Among other things, it manufactured fonts designed by Czech type designers Oldřich Menhart and Josef Týfa.

Typefaces
These foundry types were produced by Grafotechna:

External links 
"Manuscript" font by Oldřich Menhart, 1946. Released in Czechoslovakia by Grafotechna
Czechoslovak Typography
History of Grafotechna (in Czech)

References

Letterpress font foundries
Cold type foundries
Metal companies of the Czech Republic
Manufacturing companies of Czechoslovakia
Manufacturing companies based in Prague